Maria Chefaliady-Taban (4 November 186311 June 1932) was a Romanian pianist, music educator and composer. She was born in Iaşi and studied at the Iaşi Conservatory with Anetta Boscoff. She continued her studies from 1883-85 in Vienna with Joseph Dachs and Joseph Hellmesberger  at the Akademie fur Musik und Darstellende Kunst.

After completing her studies, Chefaliady-Taban performed as a concert pianist and later became a singing teacher in Iasi and Bucharest. She died in Bucharest.

Works
Chefaliady-Taban incorporated folk-lore into her compositions. Selected works include:
Hora carturarului Urechia (Scholar Urechia’s Ring Dance) choral work (1901)
Imnul studentilor universitari romani (Romanian Students’ Anthem) (1901) 
Atit de frageda (So Tender) (1900)
O, ramii (Oh, don’t Go) (1905)

References

1863 births
1932 deaths
19th-century classical composers
20th-century classical composers
Musicians from Iași
Romanian classical composers
Romanian music educators
Voice teachers
Women classical composers
Women music educators
20th-century women composers
19th-century women composers